Merdita is a village in the municipality of Gostivar, North Macedonia.

Demographics
As of the 2021 census, Merdita had 151 residents with the following ethnic composition:
Albanians 150
Persons for whom data are taken from administrative sources 1

References

External links

Villages in Gostivar Municipality
Albanian communities in North Macedonia